No. 10 (Army Cooperation) Squadron RCAF was formed on 5 October 1932 and renumbered as No. 110 Squadron on 15 November 1937, and then as No. 400 Squadron on 1 March 1941, as the first of the Article XV squadrons, manned and led by Canadians, but equipped with aircraft provided by the British. 
No. 10 (Bomber) Squadron RCAF was a new, unrelated unit that was formed by the Royal Canadian Air Force on 5 September 1939 for anti-submarine warfare using the same, now disused squadron number, and was active for the duration of the Second World War. 

While based on the east coast of Canada and Newfoundland it established an RCAF record for 22 attacks on U-boats and successfully sank 3, garnering the unofficial nickname of North Atlantic Squadron. The squadron flew the Westland Wapiti, Douglas Digby, and Consolidated Liberator.

Victories
30 October 1942 –  
19 September 1943 – 
26 October 1943 –

References

Bibliography

Royal Canadian Air Force squadrons (disbanded)
Military units and formations of Canada in World War II